TVLM 513-46546 is an M9 ultracool dwarf at the red dwarf/brown dwarf mass boundary in the constellation Boötes.  It exhibits flare star activity, which is most pronounced at radio wavelengths. The star has a mass approximately 80 times the mass of Jupiter (or 8 percent of the Sun's mass).  The radio emission is broadband and highly circularly polarized, similar to planetary auroral radio emissions. The radio emission is periodic, with bursts emitted every 7054 s, with nearly one hundredth of a second precision.  Subtle variations in the radio pulses could suggest that the ultracool dwarf rotates faster at the equator than the poles (differential rotation) in a manner similar to the Sun.

Planetary system

On 4 August 2020 astronomers announced the discovery of a Saturn-like planet TVLM 513b around this star with a period of  days,  a mass of between 0.35−0.42 , a circular orbit (e≃0), a semi-major axis of between 0.28−0.31 AU and an inclination angle of 71−88°.  The companion was detected by the radio astrometry method.

References

Boötes
M-type main-sequence stars
Planetary systems with one confirmed planet
J15010818+2250020